Phiala is a genus of moths in the family Eupterotidae.

Species
Some species of this genus are:

Phiala abyssinica Aurivillius, 1904
Phiala alba (Aurivillius, 1893)
Phiala albida (Plötz, 1880)
Phiala albidorsata Gaede, 1927
Phiala aurivillii (Bethune-Baker, 1915)
Phiala bamenda Strand, 1911
Phiala bergeri Rougeot, 1975
Phiala bistrigata Aurivillius, 1901
Phiala costipuncta (Herrich-Schäffer, 1855)
Phiala crassistriga Strand, 1911
Phiala cubicularis Strand, 1911
Phiala cunina Cramer, 1780
Phiala dasypoda Wallengren, 1860
Phiala esomelana (Bethune-Baker, 1927)
Phiala flavina Gaede, 1927
Phiala flavipennis Wallengren, 1875
Phiala fuscodorsata Aurivillius, 1904
Phiala hologramma (Aurivillius, 1904)
Phiala incana Distant, 1897
Phiala infuscata (Grünberg, 1907)
Phiala longilinea Berio, 1939
Phiala marshalli Aurivillius, 1904
Phiala maxima Kühne, 2007
Phiala nigrolineata Aurivillius, 1903
Phiala niveociliata Strand, 1911
Phiala novemlineata Aurivillius, 1911
Phiala ochriventris Strand, 1911
Phiala odites Schaus, 1893
Phiala parabiota Kühne, 2007
Phiala polita Distant, 1897
Phiala postmedialis Strand, 1911
Phiala pretoriana Wichgraf, 1908
Phiala pseudatomaria Strand, 1911
Phiala pulverea Distant, 1903
Phiala punctulata Pagenstecher, 1903
Phiala sabalina Rebel, 1914
Phiala similis Aurivillius, 1911
Phiala simplex Aurivillius, 1904
Phiala specialis Kühne, 2007.
Phiala subiridescens (Holland, 1893)
Phiala subochracea Strand, 1911
Phiala tanganyikae Strand, 1911
Phiala ueleae Kühne, 2007
Phiala uelleburgensis Strand, 1912
Phiala unistriga Gaede, 1927
Phiala venusta (Walker, 1865)
Phiala wichgrafi Strand, 1911

References

Eupterotinae